The S.B.O.A Matric. & Hr. Sec. School is recognized by the government of Tamil Nadu. The school was established in June 1985. The school is co-educational and the medium of instruction is English.S.B.O.A Matric & Hr. Sec. School, Coimbatore is run by the State Bank of India Officer's Association Educational Trust. The school has made remarkable strides in terms of academic excellence, personality development in students and infrastructure.  
•	“EDUCATE & ILLUMINATE” is the motto of our school.  The school aims at providing a full, liberal and comprehensive education in order to prepare children to become self reliant productive individuals with clarity, precision and independence. 
•	School provides a fully functional frame work to inspire children handle challenges and find joy with a keen sense of discipline, integrity, loyalty and responsibility.
It is located in the city of Coimbatore, Tamilnadu, India.

Staff and Students
The school principal is Mr. Mehlam., M.Sc., B.Ed.,M.Phil. The School imparts education to a mammoth strength of three thousand five hundred odd studenrs with 135staff doing yeomen service to the society. •	Our school  has highly qualified teaching staff with rich experience.  Decades of extensive teaching experience combined with latest teaching methodologies, in-service training, refresher programmes, micro teaching sessions and workshops by renowned academicians from time to time open up a new flight path for the teachers to mentor their students. 
•	Teachers involve themselves in all the activities of the school, thus enabling the students to reach greater heights far beyond their academics.  Special efforts are made by teachers to give personal attention to each pupil so as to enrich his / her life.

Infrastructure
The infrastructure of the school with its aerated classromms, modern laboratories, smartboard facilities, burgeoning library, bookshop, hanging garden and herbal garden awaits the arrival of the children with warmth to develop wisdom.
•	The ATAL  innovation Mission’s (AIM) key initiative of establishing a network of ATAL Tinkering Laboratories(ATL) has a vision to “Cultivate one million children in India as Neoteric Innovators” with the objective of creating scientific temper as well as cultivating the spirit of innovation and creativity among young minds.  ATL provides an enabling environment for students to innovate through a do-it yourself  approach.  The fully furnished ATL Lab is equipped with sophisticated machine and instruments. 	The lab has scheduled to organise regular activities like ATL classes in STEAM (Science, Technology, Engineering, Art and Math), workshops for students and teachers, intra and inter school competitions, guest lectures, mentoring sessions, summer and winter camps etc.

Sports
The school has facilities for basket ball, football, ball badminton, kho kho, badminton, table tennis, cricket and many other field games. •	Through sports,  the school empowers the students with decision making skills along with values of discipline, dignity, dedication and devotion to higher causes making them better citizens.

Extra Curricular Activities
•	The school provides facilities for a number of talent search programmes besides the academic curriculum.  There are many ways a genius is moulded and brought out at SBOA.  Apart from arts, music and other curricular activities, public performance forums like drama, elocution, quizzing and debating also form an integral part of the activities. Thus the students are given an experience of fellowship and mutual aid which are essential ingredients of a well balanced personality. 
•	Standard wise projects on varied topics enable pupils to exhibit their innate talents, skills and potentials.

Houses
The school has four houses

References

External links
 Official website

Primary schools in Tamil Nadu
High schools and secondary schools in Tamil Nadu
Schools in Coimbatore
Educational institutions established in 1985
1985 establishments in Tamil Nadu